In linguistics, lenition is a sound change that alters consonants, making them more sonorous. The word lenition itself means "softening" or "weakening" (from Latin  'weak'). Lenition can happen both synchronically (within a language at a particular point in time) and diachronically (as a language changes over time). Lenition can involve such changes as voicing a voiceless consonant, causing a consonant to relax occlusion, to lose its place of articulation (a phenomenon called debuccalization, which turns a consonant into a glottal consonant like  or ), or even causing a consonant to disappear entirely.

In some languages, lenition has been grammaticalized into a consonant mutation, which means it is no longer triggered by its phonological environment but is now governed by its syntactic or morphological environment.

The opposite of lenition, fortition, a sound change that makes a consonant "stronger", is less common.

Types
Lenition involves changes in manner of articulation, sometimes accompanied by small changes in place of articulation. There are two main lenition pathways: opening and sonorization. In both cases, a stronger sound becomes a weaker one. Lenition can be seen as a movement on the sonority hierarchy from less sonorous to more sonorous, or on a strength hierarchy from stronger to weaker.

In examples below, a greater-than sign indicates that one sound changes to another.

The sound change of palatalization sometimes involves lenition.

Lenition includes the loss of a feature, such as deglottalization, in which glottalization or ejective articulation is lost:  or  > .

The tables below show common sound changes involved in lenition. In some cases, lenition may skip one of the sound changes. The change voiceless stop > fricative is more common than the series of changes voiceless stop > affricate > fricative.

Opening
In the opening type of lenition, the articulation becomes more open with each step. Opening lenition involves several sound changes: shortening of double consonants, affrication of stops, spirantization of stops or affricates, debuccalization, and finally elision.
  or  >  (shortening)
  >  (affrication, for example  to )
  or  >  (spirantization, example in Gilbertese language)
  > ;  >  (debuccalization, example in English or Spanish)

Sonorization
The sonorization type involves voicing. Sonorizing lenition involves several sound changes: voicing, approximation, and vocalization.
  >  (voicing, example in Korean)
  >  (approximation, example in Spanish)
  >  (vocalization)

Sonorizing lenition occurs especially often intervocalically (between vowels).  In this position, lenition can be seen as a type of assimilation of the consonant to the surrounding vowels, in which features of the consonant that are not present in the surrounding vowels (e.g. obstruction, voicelessness) are gradually eliminated.

Some of the sounds generated by lenition are often subsequently "normalized" into related but cross-linguistically more common sounds.  An example would be the changes  →  →  and  →  → .  Such normalizations correspond to diagonal movements down and to the right in the above table.  In other cases, sounds are lenited and normalized at the same time; examples would be direct changes  →  or  → .

Vocalization
L-vocalization is a subtype of the sonorization type of lenition. It has two possible results: a velar approximant or back vowel, or a palatal approximant or front vowel. In French, l-vocalization of the sequence  resulted in the diphthong , which was monophthongized, yielding the monophthong  in Modern French.

Mixed
Sometimes a particular example of lenition mixes the opening and sonorization pathways.

Lenition can be seen in Canadian and American English, where  and  soften to a tap  (flapping) when not in initial position and followed by an unstressed vowel. For example, both rate and raid plus the suffix -er are pronounced . In many British English dialects, a different lenition that affects only  takes place:  >  (see T-glottalization). In Tuscany,  likewise is realized  between vowels, and in typical speech of Central Tuscany, the voiceless stops  in the same position are pronounced respectively , as in  →  'the house',  →  'hole'.

Effects

Diachronic
Diachronic lenition is found, for example, in the change from Latin into Spanish, in which the intervocalic voiceless stops  first changed into their voiced counterparts , and later into the approximants or fricatives :  > ,  > ,  > ,  > . One stage in these changes goes beyond phonetic to have become a phonological restructuring, e.g.  >  (compare  in Italian, with no change in the phonological status of ).

A similar development occurred in the Celtic languages, where non-geminate intervocalic consonants were converted into their corresponding weaker counterparts through lenition (usually stops into fricatives but also laterals and trills into weaker laterals and taps), and voiceless stops became voiced.

The Latin words preserved the original stops, which became fricatives in old Germanic by Grimm's law.

Although actually a much more profound change encompassing syllable restructuring, simplification of geminate consonants as in the passage from Latin to Spanish such as cuppa >  'cup' is often viewed as a type of lenition (compare geminate-preserving Italian ).

Synchronic

Allophonic
All varieties of Sardinian, with the sole exception of Nuorese, offer an example of sandhi in which the rule of intervocalic lenition applying to the voiced series /b d g/ extends across word boundaries. Since it is a fully active synchronic rule, lenition is not normally indicated in the standard orthographies.

A series of synchronic lenitions involving opening, or loss of occlusion, rather than voicing is found for post-vocalic  in many Tuscan dialects of Central Italy. Word-internally, the normal realization is also :   'hole' → .

Grammatical
In the Celtic languages, the phenomenon of intervocalic lenition historically extended across word boundaries. This explains the rise of grammaticalised initial consonant mutations in modern Celtic languages through the loss of endings. The following examples show the development of a phrase consisting of a definite article plus a masculine noun (taking the ending ) compared with a feminine noun taking the ending . The historic development of lenition in those two cases can be reconstructed as follows:

Proto-Celtic  IPA:  → Old Irish   → Middle Irish   → Classical Gaelic   → Modern Gaelic  

Proto-Celtic  IPA:  → Old Irish   → Middle Irish   → Classical Gaelic   → Modern Gaelic  

Synchronic lenition in Scottish Gaelic affects almost all consonants (except , which has lost its lenited counterpart in most areas). (It may also leave a residue of nasalization in adjacent vowels.)

Blocked lenition 
Some languages which have lenition have in addition complex rules affecting situations where lenition might be expected to occur but does not, often those involving homorganic consonants. This is colloquially known as 'blocked lenition', or more technically as 'homorganic inhibition' or 'homorganic blocking'. In Scottish Gaelic, for example, there are three homorganic groups:
 d n t l s (usually called the dental group in spite of the non-dental nature of the palatals)
 c g (usually called the velar group)
 b f m p (usually called the labial group)
In a position where lenition is expected due to the grammatical environment, lenition tends to be blocked if there are two adjacent homorganic consonants across the word boundary. For example:
  'one' (which causes lenition) →  'one leg' vs  'one house' (not )
  'on the' (which causes lenition) →  'on the big leg' vs  "on the brown house" (not )
In modern Scottish Gaelic this rule is only productive in the case of dentals but not the other two groups for the vast majority of speakers. It also does not affect all environments any more. For example, while  still invokes the rules of blocked lenition, a noun followed by an adjective generally no longer does so. Hence:
  "hat" (a feminine noun causing lenition) →  "a brown hat" (although some highly conservative speakers retain )
  "girl" (a feminine noun causing lenition) →  "a smart girl" (not )
There is a significant number of frozen forms involving the other two groups (labials and velars) and environments as well, especially in surnames and place names:
  'Montgomery' ( + ) vs  'MacDonald ( + )
  'Campbell' ( 'crooked' +  'mouth') vs  'Cameron' ( +  'nose')
  'Sgian-dubh' ( 'knife' +  '1 black 2 hidden';  as a feminine noun today would normally cause lenition on a following adjective) vs  "a black knife" (i.e., a common knife which just happens to be black)
Though rare, in some instances the rules of blocked lenition can be invoked by lost historical consonants, for example, in the case of the past-tense copula , which in Common Celtic had a final -t. In terms of blocked lenition, it continues to behave as a dental-final particle invoking blocked lenition rules:
  "bad was the food" versus  'great was the pity

In Brythonic languages, only fossilized vestiges of lenition blocking occur, for example in Welsh  'good night' lenition is blocked ( as a feminine noun normally causes lenition of a following modifier, for example  'Friday' yields  'Friday night'). Within Celtic, blocked lenition phenomena also occur in Irish (for example  'one door',  'the first person') and Manx (for example  'one door',  'the first man') however. 

Outside Celtic, in Spanish orthographic b d g are retained as  following nasals rather than their normal lenited forms .

Orthography

In the modern Celtic languages, lenition of the "fricating" type is usually denoted by adding an h to the lenited letter. An exception is Manx Orthography, which tends to be more phonetic, although in some cases etymological principles are applied. In the Gaelic script, fricating lenition (usually called simply lenition) is indicated by a dot above the affected consonant, while in the Roman script, the convention is to suffix the letter  to the consonant, to signify that it is lenited.

Voicing lenition is represented by a simple letter switch in the Brythonic languages, for instance , "stone" → , "the stone" in Welsh. In Irish orthography, it is shown by writing the "weak" consonant alongside the (silent) "strong" one: , "pen" →  "our pen", "head" →  "our head" (sonorization is traditionally called "eclipsis" in Irish grammar).

Although nasalization as a feature also occurs in most Scottish Gaelic dialects, it is not shown in the orthography on the whole as it is synchronic (i.e., the result of certain types of nasals affecting a following sound), rather than the diachronic Irish type sonorization (i.e., following historic nasals). For example   "house" →   "the house".

Consonant gradation

The phenomenon of consonant gradation in Finnic languages is also a form of lenition.

An example with geminate consonants comes from Finnish, where geminates become simple consonants while retaining voicing or voicelessness (e.g.  → ,  → ). It is also possible for entire consonant clusters to undergo lenition, as in Votic, where voiceless clusters become voiced, e.g.  "to cry" → .

If a language has no obstruents other than voiceless stops, other sounds are encountered, as in Finnish, where the lenited grade is represented by chronemes, approximants, taps or even trills. In the Southern Ostrobothnian, Tavastian and southwestern dialects of Finnish,  mostly changed into , thus the dialects have a synchronic lenition of an alveolar stop into an alveolar trill .

Fortition

Fortition is the opposite of lenition: a consonant mutation in which a consonant changes from one considered weak to one considered strong. Fortition is less frequent than lenition in the languages of the world, but word-initial and word-final fortition is fairly frequent.

Italian, for example, presents numerous regular examples of word-initial fortition both historically (Lat.  with initial  > , with ) and synchronically (e.g.,  "house, home" →  but  "at home" → ).

Catalan is among numerous Romance languages with diachronic word-final devoicing ( >  >  .

See also
 Apophony
 Begadkefat
 Chain shift
 Consonant mutation
 Germanic spirant law
 Grimm's Law
 High German consonant shift
 Historical linguistics
 Rendaku (a similar phenomenon in the Japanese language)

References

Citations

General references 
 Crowley, Terry (1997). An Introduction to Historical Linguistics. 3rd edition. Oxford University Press.
 

Phonology
Linguistic morphology
Celtic languages